The Cache River Bridge is a Parker pony truss that spans the Cache River between Walnut Ridge and Paragould, Arkansas. It was built in 1934 by the Arkansas State Highway Commission and was designed by the Vincennes Bridge Company. Formerly carrying U.S. Route 412 and earlier Arkansas Highway 25, the structure was added to the National Register of Historic Places in 1990, and was bypassed by a new bridge in 1995.

Routes
At construction the bridge carried Arkansas Highway 25 over the Cache River in 1934. Highway 25 was replaced by U.S. Route 412 in the area in 1982. The Cache River Bridge was replaced in 1995 with the new four-lane bridge being built adjacent to the north.

Description
Built at a 45-degree skew, the bridge's only span is rivet-connected and consists of 11 panels. The bridge is an excellent example of the Vincennes Bridge Company's later work, in contrast to the War Eagle Bridge in Northwest Arkansas.

See also
List of bridges documented by the Historic American Engineering Record in Arkansas
List of bridges on the National Register of Historic Places in Arkansas
National Register of Historic Places listings in Lawrence County, Arkansas

References

External links

Bridgehunter

Historic American Engineering Record in Arkansas
Road bridges on the National Register of Historic Places in Arkansas
Bridges completed in 1934
Transportation in Lawrence County, Arkansas
National Register of Historic Places in Lawrence County, Arkansas
Steel bridges in the United States
Parker truss bridges in the United States
1934 establishments in Arkansas
U.S. Route 412
Bridges of the United States Numbered Highway System